Bradford is an unincorporated community and census-designated place in Franklin County, Iowa, United States. Its population was 99 as of the 2010 census.

Bradford was platted in 1906.

Demographics

Notes

Census-designated places in Iowa
Census-designated places in Franklin County, Iowa
1906 establishments in Iowa
Populated places established in 1906